Lijia is a town in Jiande, Zhejiang province, China. , it administers Lijia Residential Community and the following ten villages:
Lijia Village
Zhujia Village
Xinqiao Village
Sanxi Village
Xinlian Village
Longqiao Village
Shaduntou Village
Changlin Village
Baima Village
Shigu Village

References

Towns of Zhejiang
Jiande